Edwin Ziegler (25 February 1930 – 19 March 2020) was a German road racing cyclist. He won the bronze medal in the men's individual road race at the 1952 Summer Olympics in Helsinki, Finland, behind two Belgians: André Noyelle (gold) and Robert Grondelaers (silver). He was a professional rider from 1957 to 1959.

References

External links
 
 

1930 births
2020 deaths
People from Schweinfurt
Sportspeople from Lower Franconia
German male cyclists
Cyclists at the 1952 Summer Olympics
Olympic cyclists of Germany
Olympic bronze medalists for Germany
Olympic medalists in cycling
Cyclists from Bavaria
Medalists at the 1952 Summer Olympics
20th-century German people